Philip Nicholas McBride is an Australian politician. He has been a Liberal member of the South Australian House of Assembly since the 2018 state election, representing MacKillop.

McBride, a grazier, was president of the Grassland Society of South Australia in 2017.

References

External links

Members of the South Australian House of Assembly
Year of birth missing (living people)
Living people
Liberal Party of Australia members of the Parliament of South Australia
21st-century Australian politicians